The McCormack–Nagelsen Tennis Center (MNTC) is a $3,000,000,  facility that is home to the College of William & Mary’s women's tennis team as well as the Intercollegiate Tennis Association’s Women's Tennis Hall of Fame. It is located in Williamsburg, Virginia. The facility includes six indoor courts and stadium seating. The center was named after College alumnus Mark McCormack (Class of 1951) and his wife, retired professional tennis player Betsy Nagelsen. In 1995, the year the MNTC opened, it won an USTA Outstanding Facility Award for a collegiate facility.

See also
Busch Tennis Courts

References

External links
College Tennis Online: College of William and Mary Women Facilities
Intercollegiate Tennis Association
ITA Hall of Fame
Betsy Nagelsen McCormack tennis biography
Tribe Athletics

William & Mary Tribe sports venues
College of William & Mary buildings
William & Mary Tribe tennis
Tennis venues in Virginia
Sports venues in Hampton Roads
Sports venues completed in 1995
1995 establishments in Virginia